Southern Railway 401 is a steam locomotive built in December 1907 by the Baldwin Locomotive Works for Southern Railway. It is a 2-8-0 "Consolidation" type of Southern's "H-4" class.

History
Southern Railway #401 is one of 2 surviving 25 class "H-4" 2-8-0 "Consolidation" type steam locomotives the other being Southern Railway 385 in the Whippany Railway Museum. 401 was built by the Baldwin Locomotive Works of Philadelphia, Pennsylvania in December 1907. The H-4 class was generally used in mixed train service, to haul branch line freight trains, and later, as yard switchers. In 1949, #401 was sold to the Alabama Asphaltic Limestone Company in Margerum, Alabama. She switched hopper cars of stone until the company brought in a diesel locomotive in 1963. The #401 was then placed on standby service in case the diesel broke down. Sometimes, she would be fired up for company picnics so children could blow the whistle. In 1965, #401 was officially retired from service.

The locomotive was purchased from Alabama Asphaltic Limestone by the Society for the Preservation of Unretired Railfans (SPUR) in 1967. In January 1968, the locomotive was loaded on a flat car by two Southern Railway steam cranes and shipped to Decatur, Illinois. The #401 was unloaded from the flat car in the Norfolk & Western's former Wabash Ry Decatur Shops and set back on its own wheels, then it was stored in the Decatur Yards.  SPUR purchased grounds from the Illinois Terminal Railroad near Monticello, Illinois for its museum and demonstration railroad in February 1970. The name of the organization was changed to Monticello & Sangamon Valley Railway Historical Society (M&SV) to reflect its location near Monticello and the Sangamon River Valley. M&SV had its Monticello site developed enough to receive the #401 and other stored railroad equipment in October 1971 and the #401 was moved on its own wheels to the museum. It was cosmetically restored for display. M&SV changed its name again to the Monticello Railway Museum (MRyM) in November 1984.

In 1987, the museum purchased seven miles of the adjacent Illinois Central branch line which served the museum. At approximately the same time, the two steam locomotives the museum had been using since 1972, an 0-4-0 gravel pit engine and an 0-6-0 industrial switcher were coming out of service for heavy repairs. Additionally, the Federal Railroad Administration (FRA) decided to exercise jurisdiction over railroad museums and apply their equipment safety standards to museum operations. Neither of the museum's two industrial steam switchers had ever operated under Interstate Commerce Commission (FRA's predecessor) rules, whereas the #401 had. With the demands of the new Illinois Central trackage and the new regulatory environment, it was decided the #401 would be the better locomotive of the three the museum owned to restore for the new operation. The two steam switchers would be retired in favor of spending funds restoring the #401. In 1995, the museum made serious plans to restore the #401 to operating condition.  The restoration by museum volunteers took fifteen years. This included replacing the boiler. The museum operated the locomotive for the first time for the public in September 2010 for its annual Railroad Days event. As of 2022 she is back in service following a 1472 day inspection. The locomotive is now certified for use.

References

External links
 Image

Individual locomotives of the United States
2-8-0 locomotives
Steam locomotives of Southern Railway (U.S.)
Baldwin locomotives
Railway locomotives introduced in 1907
Standard gauge locomotives of the United States
Preserved steam locomotives of Illinois